Kädy Plaas (born on 1 October 1979 in Pärnu) is an Estonian opera singer (soprano).

In 2014, she graduated from Estonian Academy of Music and Theatre (master's degree).

Between 2002 to 2004, she sang in the Estonian Philharmonic Chamber Choir. Since 2004, she has been a soloist for the project-theatre Nargen Opera. Since 2004, Plaas is a voice teacher at Georg Ots Tallinn Music School, and Lecturer at Estonian Academy of Music and Theatre.

Opera roles

 Sylvia (Haydn's "Üksik saar", 2004 at Nargen Opera)
 Zelmira (Haydn's "Armida", 2005 at Nargen Operas)
 Hannerl (Schubert's ja Berté's "Kolme neitsi maja", 2005 at Estonia Theatre)

References

Living people
1979 births
Estonian operatic sopranos
21st-century Estonian women opera singers
Estonian Academy of Music and Theatre alumni
People from Pärnu